Wedge resection is a surgical procedure to remove a triangle-shaped slice of tissue. It may be used to remove a tumor or some other type of tissue that requires removal and typically includes a small amount of normal tissue around it.
It is easy to repair, does not greatly distort the shape of the underlying organ and leaves just a single stitch line as a residual.

References

 Wedge resection entry in the public domain NCI Dictionary of Cancer Terms

Surgical removal procedures
Surgical oncology